Apatronemertes is a genus of nemertean worms belonging to the family Lineidae.

The species of this genus are found in America and Japan.

Species:
 Apatronemertes albimaculosa Wilfert & Gibson, 1974

References

Lineidae
Nemertea genera